Germany is an unincorporated community in Clark County, Indiana, in the United States.

History
A majority of the early settlers being natives of Germany caused the name to be selected.

References

Unincorporated communities in Clark County, Indiana
Unincorporated communities in Indiana